The  Asian Sports Award (ASA)  is a recognition programme conceived by Stropt and Sports Limited (HK) in collaboration with the Asian Sports Press Union (ASPU). Its aim is to honour, champion and promote the world-class sports heroes of Asia. They named Liu Xiang and Nicol  Ann  David  as  the  recipients  of  the  inaugural  Asian  Sportsman  and Sportswoman of the Year awards.

Asian Sportsman of the Year Award Winner
 2007:  Liu Xiang Event: Athletics

Asian Sportswoman of the Year Award Winner
 2007:  Nicol Ann David Event: Squash

Asian Team of the Year (Men) Winner
 2007:  Lee Ho-Suk, Ahn Hyun-Soo, Seo Ho-Jin, Song Suk-Woo Event: Short track speed skating

Asian Team of the Year (Women) Winner
 2007:  Gao Ling, Huang Sui Event: Badminton

Lifetime achievement award
 2007:  Ramanathan Krishnan Event: Tennis

Asian Sportsman of the year
 2007:  Shahid Afridi Event: Cricket

References

External links
International Sports Press Association

Asian sports trophies and awards